Individualization  may refer to
discrimination or perception of the individual within a group or species
identification in forensics and intelligence
the development of individual traits
a central concept in the philosophy of C. G. Jung on personal development, under the term individuation.
in sociology and political theory, a process towards individualism  (so in Hans T. Blokland, Georg Simmel, Ferdinand Tönnies)
in recent sociology (Ulrich Beck and Elisabeth Beck-Gernsheim, Zygmunt Bauman) the consequence of social changes in late modernity, in which individuals are increasingly required to construct their own lives.
in economics, separate taxation of married couples
personalization; using technology to accommodate the differences between individuals
Personalized learning

See also

Individuation